Malcolmia africana, or African mustard, is an annual plant from the Mediterranean Basin which has naturalized elsewhere, including much of western North America, and is invasive in Nevada and Utah. It has recently been shown to be only distantly related to Malcolmia proper and has been reclassified in the genus Strigosella.

It is an annual herb growing in a prostrate patch or clump with stiff, furry stems up to half a meter long. The mustardlike flowers are pink to lavender and yield siliques up to 6 centimeters long.

External links

Jepson Manual Treatment
Calflora.net
USDA Plants Profile
ITIS
Photo gallery

Brassicaceae